Andrew Bracey (born 1978) is an English artist, currently based in Manchester.

Early life and education
Bracey was born in Bristol, England. He studied fine art at Liverpool John Moores University, and Manchester Metropolitan University.

Career
Bracey has shown widely at galleries including Manchester Art Gallery; ICA, London; Pumphouse gallery, London; The Lowry, Salford; and Chapter Arts Centre, Cardiff. he has been shortlisted for the John Moore’s Painting Prize, Oriel Mostyn open and Emergency at aspex. He has had exhibitions at firstsite, Colchester; Transition Gallery, London; Porch Gallery, Manchester; The Usher Gallery, Lincoln. Andrew Bracey is a member of Suite Studio Group.

Bracey is a senior lecturer in Fine Art at The University of Lincoln, and has been a visiting lecturer at Liverpool John Moores, Huddersfield, Salford and Wolverhampton Universities.

References

External links 
Official web site
 Exhibition CV listing
Suite Studio Group
 Art in the Bar

English artists
1978 births
Living people
Alumni of Liverpool John Moores University
Alumni of Manchester Metropolitan University
Academics of the University of Lincoln